Piotr Antoni Wilczek (born 26 April 1962 in Chorzów) is a Polish intellectual historian, a specialist in comparative literature and a literary translator, who served as the Ambassador of Poland to the United States (2016–2021) and the United Kingdom (since 2022).

Academic career 

Piotr Wilczek graduated from the University of Silesia in Katowice, Poland (1986) where he received his Ph.D. (1992) and Habilitation (2001) degrees. In 2006 he was nominated professor of the humanities by the President of the Republic of Poland. Doctor of Humane Letters (honoris causa) of Cleveland State University.

He was an assistant and associate professor at the University of Silesia (1986–2008), where he also served as Dean of the Faculty of Languages (2002–2008). Since 2008 he has been a tenured full professor at the Faculty of „Artes Liberales", University of Warsaw and until 2016 served there as Head of the Collegium Artes Liberales (College of Liberal Arts and Sciences) and Head of the Centre for the Study of the Reformation and Intellectual Culture in Early Modern Europe.

He did his postgraduate work in intellectual history and Neo-Latin Studies at the Universities of Oxford (St Anne's College, 1988) and Łódź, Poland (1989). He was a visiting translator at The British Centre for Literary Translation, University of East Anglia (1994, 1996). In 1998–2001 he was a visiting professor at Rice University, the University of Illinois at Chicago and the University of Chicago and gave invited public lectures at Harvard and the University of Texas at Austin. He was also a visiting scholar at Boston College and Cleveland State University.

He has been a board member of numerous international scholarly journals (e.g. “Reformation and Renaissance Review”, “The Sarmatian Review”), book series (at Springer-Verlag GmbH and Walter de Gruyter GmbH) and academic initiatives (including the Reformation Research Consortium (RefoRC) and the Post-Reformation Digital Library), and a member of several professional organizations (e.g. Modern Language Association of America, the Polish Literary Translators' Association). Since 2014 Representative in Poland of the Kosciuszko Foundation, Inc. (New York) and President of the Management Board of the Kosciuszko Foundation Poland. Member of the American Study Group at the Polish Institute of International Affairs.

Diplomatic career 
Starting 9 November 2016, Wilczek served as the Ambassador of Poland to the United States, succeeding Ryszard Schnepf. He ended his term on 31 October 2021. On 22 December 2021 he was nominated ambassador to the United Kingdom. He started his term on 15 February 2022.

Honours 

 Knight's Cross of the Order of Polonia Restituta (2022)

Books

Books in English (authored and edited) 

 Polonia Reformata. Essays on the Polish Reformation(s). Vandenhoeck & Ruprecht, Göttingen 2016.
 Collegium / College / Kolegium. College and the Academic Community in the European and the American Tradition. Edited by Mark O'Connor and Piotr Wilczek. Wydawnictwo Sub Lupa: Boston – Warsaw, 2011.
 (Mis)translation and (Mis)interpretation: Polish Literature in the Context of Cross-Cultural Communication. Peter Lang: Frankfurt am Main, 2005.
 Treny: The Laments of Kochanowski. Translated by Adam Czerniawski. Foreword by Donald Davie. Edited and annotated by Piotr Wilczek. Legenda: Oxford, 2001.

Books in Polish (authored and edited) 

 Literatura piękna i medycyna. Homini, Kraków 2015 (co-editor: Maciej Ganczar).
 Tłumacz i przekład – wyzwania współczesności, Katowice: ŚLĄSK 2013 (co-editor: Maciej Ganczar).
 Rola tłumacza i przekładu w epoce wielokulturowości i globalizacji. ŚLĄSK, Katowice 2012 (co-editor: Maciej Ganczar).
 Wiesław Mincer, Jan Kalwin w Polsce. Bibliografia. Edited by Piotr Wilczek. Sub Lupa: Warszawa 2012.
 Angielsko-polskie związki literackie. Szkice o przekładzie artystycznym. Wydawnictwo Naukowe "Śląsk": Katowice, 2011.
 Jan Kochanowski. Wydawnictwo Nomen Omen: Katowice, 2011 (e-book).
 Reformacja w Polsce i Europie Środkowo-Wschodniej. Postulaty badawcze. Edited by Piotr Wilczek. Assistant Editors: Michał Choptiany, Jakub Koryl, Alan Ross. Wydawnictwo Sub Lupa: Warszawa, 2010.
 Retoryka. Edited by Piotr Wilczek, Maria Barłowska, Agnieszka Budzyńska-Daca. Wydawnictwo Naukowe PWN: Warszawa, 2008.
 Polonice et Latine. Studia o literaturze staropolskiej. Wydawnictwo Uniwersytetu Śląskiego: Katowice, 2007.
 Literatura polskiego renesansu. Wydawnictwo Uniwersytetu Śląskiego: Katowice, 2005.
 Dyskurs – przekład – interpretacja: literatura staropolska i jej trwanie we współczesnej kulturze. Gnome: Katowice, 2001.
 Poezja polskiego renesansu. Interpretacje. Książnica: Katowice, 2000 (co-author: Kazimierz Martyn).
 Erazm Otwinowski, Pisma poetyckie. Edited by Piotr Wilczek. IBL PAN: Warszawa, 1999.
 Szkolny słownik literatury staropolskiej. Videograf II: Katowice, 1999 (co-authors: Janusz K. Goliński, Roman Mazurkiewicz).
 Ślady egzystencji. Szkice o polskich pisarzach emigracyjnych. Wydawnictwo Naukowe „Śląsk”: Katowice, 1997.
 Jan Kochanowski, Treny. Translated by Adam Czerniawski. Foreword Donald Davie. Edited and annotated by Piotr Wilczek. Wydawnictwo Uniwersytetu Śląskiego: Katowice, 1996.
 Erazm Otwinowski – pisarz ariański. Gnome: Katowice, 1994.
 Spory  o  Biblię  w  literaturze  Renesansu i Reformacji. Schumacher: Kielce 1995.

Translations from English into Polish 

 Aleksander Topolski: Biez wodki. Moje wojenne przeżycia w Rosji [Without Vodka. Adventures in Wartime Russia]. REBIS: Poznań, 2011.
 Thomas M. Gannon, George W. Traub, Pustynia i miasto [The Desert and the city. An Interpretation of the History of Christian Spirituality]. WAM: Kraków, 1999.
 John Berendt, Północ w ogrodzie dobra i zła. Opowieść o Savannah [Midnight in the Garden of Good and Evil. A Savannah Story]. Prószyński i S-ka: Warszawa, 1998.
 John  J. O'Donnell, Tajemnica Trójcy Świętej [The Mystery  of the Triune God]. WAM: Kraków, 1993.
 Carlos G. Valles, Szkice o Bogu [Sketches of God]. WAM: Kraków, 1994.
 Michael  Paul  Gallagher, Możesz wierzyć. Dziesięć etapów  na drodze do wiary [Free to Believe. Ten Steps to  Faith]. WAM: Kraków, 1995.

Sources 
 Piotr Wilczek – "Scientists" – database of OPI (Information Processing Centre)

References

External links 
 Faculty of "Artes Liberales"
 Polish National Library Catalogue
 Polish Literary Translators' Association
Piotr Wilczek

1962 births
Ambassadors of Poland to the United Kingdom
Ambassadors of Poland to the United States
English–Polish translators
Knights of the Order of Polonia Restituta
Living people
People from Chorzów
20th-century Polish historians
Polish male non-fiction writers
Polish translators
Recipients of the Decoration of Honor Meritorious for Polish Culture
University of Silesia in Katowice alumni
Academic staff of the University of Silesia in Katowice
21st-century Polish historians